Chained Soldier, known in Japan as , is a Japanese manga series written by Takahiro and illustrated by Yohei Takemura. It has been serialized on Shueisha's Shōnen Jump+ online platform since January 2019. An anime television series adaptation by Seven Arcs is set to premiere in 2023.

Plot 
Gates to another dimension called Mato begin opening across Japan, where monsters known as Shuuki begin attacking the inhabitants of the Earth. Inside these portals are a resource called a "Peach", which when consumed by women give them supernatural powers, leading to a matriarchal society. One day, Yuuki Wakura, a recent high school graduate, stumbles inside a gate and meets Kyouka Uzen, the commander of the 7th squad of the Demon Defense Force. Kyouka has the power to 'enslave' Shuuki and mount them for combat, but cornered by an increasing number of Shuuki, she asks Yuuki if she can enslave him. He consents and turns into her 'slave', and they defeat the Shuuki. However, she discovers that in exchange for using his body, she must give him an appropriate reward, often sexual in nature. Yuuki decides to join Kyouka's squad as a caretaker and support her dream of becoming the Supreme Commander, while fighting the Shuuki and discovering the mystery behind Mato.

Characters

Media

Manga
Shueisha has collected its chapters into individual tankōbon volumes. The first volume was released on March 4, 2019. As of January 4, 2023, twelve volumes have been released.

The manga is licensed in North America by Yen Press, in France by Kurokawa, and in Italy by Panini Comics.

Volume list

Anime
On November 19, 2021, it was announced that the series will be adapted into an anime television series by Seven Arcs. The series is directed by Gorō Kuji, with Junji Nishimura serving as general director, Yasuhiro Nakanishi handling series composition, Ryota Kanō and Akira Kindaichi writing the scripts, Hiroyuki Yoshii designing the characters, and Kohta Yamamoto composing the music. It is set to premiere in 2023. The opening theme song will be performed by Akari Kitō, while the ending theme song will be performed by Maaya Uchida.

Reception
As of November 2021, the manga had over 1 million copies in circulation.

References

External links
  
  
 

2019 webcomic debuts
2023 anime television series debuts
Action anime and manga
Anime series based on manga
Dark fantasy anime and manga
Japanese webcomics
Seven Arcs
Shōnen manga
Shueisha manga
Upcoming anime television series
Webcomics in print
Yen Press titles